The 2016 IFAF U-19 World Championship was an international American football tournament for junior teams (19 years and under) that took place at Harbin, China from June 29 to July 10. This is the first time that China has hosted an international American football competition.

Teams were split into higher and lower groups by seeding. Three teams from higher seeded group and one team from lower seeded group would advance to the semi-final.

Participants and seeding
1. 
2. 
3. 
4. 
5. 
6. 
7. 
Germany qualified for the championship but did not attend.

Matches
Game 1

Game 2

Game 3

Game 4

Game 5

Game 6

Game 7

Game 8 (semi-final)

Game 9 (semi-final)

Game 10 (5th-place game)

Game 11 (3rd-place game)

Game 12 (final)

References

External links
 Official website

IFAF Junior World Cup
American football in Asia
2016 in American football
International sports competitions hosted by China
IFAF